Nick Carlson (born May 19, 1980) is a former lacrosse player for the Colorado Mammoth in the National Lacrosse League.

During the 2009 NLL season, he was named a reserve to the All-Star game.

Statistics

NLL

References

1980 births
Canadian lacrosse players
Colorado Mammoth players
Lacrosse people from British Columbia
Living people
National Lacrosse League All-Stars
Sportspeople from Nanaimo